Howardsville is the name of several unincorporated communities in the U.S. state of Virginia.

Howardsville, Albemarle County, Virginia
Howardsville, Loudoun County, Virginia